Dr. Sadegh Nezam-mafi (1925 in Tehran – 2009 in Tehran) was an Iranian physician and a pioneer of nuclear medicine in Iran. He introduced nuclear endocrinology to the country in 1960 with a thyroid probe and a rectilinear scanner. In 1972 he published 
"Diagnostic Value of Liver Scan in Operated Echinococcus Cyst" in the German journal Strahlentherapie Sonderb.

References

Iranian nuclear medicine physicians
Year of birth uncertain
University of Pittsburgh alumni
1925 births
2009 deaths